The USA Rugby Women's Premier League (WPL or WPL Rugby) is the top annual American women's rugby union competition. It is player-run and operates in partnership with USA Rugby. It involves the top 10 clubs in the country. The league was founded in 2009.

The League initially began from 8 different Division 1 Women's Sides coming together in 2009. In 2017, the League grew to 10 clubs. In 2023, the League reduced their club numbers to 7.  

The 2020 Season was canceled on June 1, 2020 due to the worldwide coronavirus pandemic. The League started up again in 2022.

History

Founding 
The WPL was founded in 2009 with 8 of the top Division 1 Women's Teams in the US. The organization was created with the leadership of Kathy Flores, USA Eagle and Head Coach of the USA Women's Team, and Alex Williams in order to grow the Women's game and develop more potential players for the Women's National Team.

The League began with 8 clubs: Beantown Rugby, Berkeley All Blues, New York Rugby Club, Washington DC Furies, Twin City Amazons, Keystone Rugby Club, Minnesota Valkyries, and Oregon Sports Union (ORSU).

Promotion and relegation 
In 2010, the league began its promotion/relegation opportunities for Division 1 Teams to join the WPL in 2010, whereby the top-ranked Division 1 Team would challenge the bottom-ranked WPL Team for their position in the WPL. From the end of the 2016 Season until the 2019 season, the WPL stopped its relegation due to their expansion.

Expansion and beyond 
For the 2017 Season, the WPL allowed for the Leagues first expansion, growing the League from 8 to 10 teams, adding Beantown RFC and Chicago North Shore Rugby into the competition. 

In 2017, the WPL created their Inaugural All-Stars Team, composed of top players from the season who would compete in preparation for the 2017 Women's Rugby World Cup. In 2018, the WPL decided to create two All-Star Teams, one for the Eastern Conference and one for the Western Conference, allowing more players to compete at the top level of competition.

On June 1, 2020, the 2020 Season was postponed due to the coronavirus pandemic. The season was later cancelled on July 8, 2020 and the WPL has resumed in 2022.

Professionalism 
In 2023, the WPL changed their season schedule outline and moved forward towards a more professional structure. Unfortunately, this lead to three teams, the San Diego Surfers, Atlanta Harlequins, and Oregon Sports Union, specifically, to leave the WPL to focus on their club teams. With that, the Conference structure that was in place throughout most of the WPL's timeline was left behind for a cohesive league structure.

Women's Premier League teams

Map

Current teams

Timeline

Promotion/relegation

Former teams

League champions

See also
Major League Rugby
2011 Women's Premier League Rugby season
United States women's national rugby sevens team
United States women's national rugby union team

References

External links
 

Rugby union leagues in the United States
Women's rugby union competitions in the United States
Women's rugby union leagues
Sports leagues established in 2008
2008 establishments in the United States
Professional sports leagues in the United States